Trikkayil is nearby place of Neerattupuram. It is situated on Neerattupuram - Takazhi - Alappuzha road. The place is home to the Thalavady Panchayat office and the famous Sree Krishna Temple. It is an Upper Kuttanad area and the bank of Pampa River.

References

Villages in Alappuzha district